Rangpur is a district in Northern Bangladesh. It is a part of the Rangpur Division.

Geography
Under the Rangpur Division (one of eight divisions) composed of eight districts of northern Bangladesh, the District of Rangpur is bordered on the north by Nilphamari District, on the south by Gaibandha District, on the east by Kurigram, and on the west by Dinajpur district. Rangpur town is the divisional headquarter. The soil composition is mainly alluvial soil (80%) of the Teesta River basin, and the remaining is barind soil.

Travel

The main transportation methods here are by air, rail, or road. To travel by air, people have to first travel to Dhaka Domestic Airport and then fly to Saidpur Airport (DAC-SPD route). Seven flights travel this route daily. The US-Bangla Airlines, Novoair, and the Biman offer the flights. By rail, the district is accessible from Kamalapur Railway Station which runs a daily-except-Sunday train "Rangpur Express" to Rangpur Railway Station. By road, travelers have to travel   using the Savar-Kaliakair route  or  using the Tongi-Mawna route, Shamu.

History

Rangpur was conquered by the army of Raja Man Singh, a commander of the Mughal emperor, and Akbar, in 1575, but it was only until 1686 that it was fully integrated into the Mughal Empire. Place names such as Mughalbasa ('Mughal locality') and Mughalhat ('Mughal market') bear testimony to the Mughal association and past of Rangpur and its hinterland. Later on, Rangpur passed under the control of "Sarker" of Ghoraghat. During the period of the East India Company, the Fakir-Sannyasi rebellion took place. The Greater Rangpur district was divided in five districts in 1984.

The population of the district is 2.9 million according to the 2011 census.  There has been a 1.2% annual population growth between 2001 and 2011. The population density of the area is 1,200/km² .

Demographics

According to the 2011 Bangladesh census, Rangpur District had a population of 2,881,086, of which 1,443,816 were males and 1,437,270 females. Rural population was 2,438,373 (84.63%) while the urban population was 542,713 (15.37%). Rangpur district had a literacy rate of 48.60% for the population 7 years and above: 51.30% for males and 45.90% for females.

Muslims make up 90.39% of the population, while Hindus are 8.98% of the population. Ethnic minorities were 18,561.

Administrative sub-divisions 

The district has 1  city corporation and 3 municipalities, namely, Rangpur city corporation, Badarganj, Haragach and Peerganj, and eight Upazilas, namely:
 Badarganj
 Mithapukur
 Gangachara
 Kaunia
 Rangpur Sadar
 Pirgacha
 Pirganj
 Taraganj

Rangpur town, covering an area of around 43 square kilometers, lies on the bank of the Ghaghat river and was turned into a municipality back in 1869. Rangpur City Corporation, which was founded in 1979, has a population of 294,000.

Education

Begum Rokeya University is the only university in the Rangpur district. The Rangpur Medical College, is one of the major government medical colleges in Bangladesh. Carmichael College, established in 1916 by some leading zamindars, is a postgraduate college offering courses in 14 subjects in the faculties of arts, social science, science, and commerce. The most renowned educational institution in this region is Rangpur Cadet College. Other renowned institutions include Cantonment Public School & College, Rangpur (CPSCR), Rangpur Government College, Police Lines School and College and Rangpur Zilla School. Zilla School is established in 1832, this higher secondary school is known for the quality of education it offers. Other prominent educational institutions include Rangpur Government College, Begum Rokeya College, and Govt. Commercial Institute. Besides there is one polytechnic institute, one vocational institute, around 282 high schools, 722 government primary schools, 38 junior high schools, 193 NGO (Non-Government Organization) operated schools and almost 370 Madrasahs in Rangpur. Rangpur Model College is now an honors college.

Places of interest

Just south of the city of Rangpur lies the Tajhat Zamindar's palace. After the end of the British Raj, the building was abandoned and decayed rapidly, although it was used for a few years as a courthouse during the 1980s. In the year 2004, it was largely restored and turned into a museum with ancient inscriptions, art, and coins from the area on display. RDRS (Rangpur and Dinajpur Rural Service) Bangladesh, an NGO in northwest Bangladesh, has a large office and guesthouse/convention center in the town of Rangpur.

A museum and women's training center was established in Pairabondh, the birthplace of Begum Rokeya. It is half an hour's drive away from Rangpur city.

There is an ancient auditorium named 'Town Hall' at the center of the city, where different cultural programs are held. In the great Rangpur region, no economic development took place until the 90's, mainly because of the yearly flooding the region used to see before the making of "Teesta Barrage."

"Bhinno Jogot" is a theme park and a picnic spot which is situated 15 kilometers from Rangpur Town.

Jadu Nibash in Radhaballav was the house of former senior minister of Bangladesh, Mashiur Rahman Jadu Mia (1924–1979).

Media

Bangladesh Betar Rangpur (BBR) has a broadcasting station in Rangpur. Bangladesh Television (BTV) has a satellite station in Rangpur. The Rangpur Press Club is situated in Rangpur. Rangpur has almost 19 cinema halls. There are several locally published newspapers in the district.

Development organisations 

RDRS Bangladesh – previously Rangpur-Dinajpur Rural Service – has its main operational headquarters in Rangpur town at the RDRS Complex.

Notable people

 William Beveridge, British economist.
 Roquia Sakhawat Hussain, writer and social worker.
 Mashiur Rahman Jadu Mia, former Prime Minister of Bangladesh (1979).
 Hussein Muhammad Ershad, former President of Bangladesh.
 M. A. Sattar, (1925-2009), Chairman Sattar Jute Mills Ltd, Minister of Jute and Textiles, 1985-1986, Minister of Labor and Manpower, 1986-1987, MP (Narayanganj-4), 1986-1990 and Chief Whip, 1988-1990.
 Shawfikul Ghaani Shawpan, former Minister of Housing and Public Works.
Buddhadeb Guha, popular Bengali novels and fictions writer.
 Anisul Huq, poet and writer.
Dr. Rashid Askari, Bengali-English writer, fictionist, columnist, translator, media personality and the 12th vice-chancellor of Kushtia Islamic University-Bangladesh.
 Rezwana Choudhury Bannya, Bangladeshi Rabindra Sangeet artist.
 M. A. Wazed Miah, nuclear scientist.
 Abu Sadat Mohammad Sayem, 6th President of Bangladesh, first chief justice of Bangladesh,
 Sajeeb Wazed Joy, Bangladeshi houng global leader, ICT consultant and political campaigner.
 G M Quader, Bangladeshi politician, the former Minister of Commerce and former Minister of Civil Aviation,
 Nasir Hossain, Bangladeshi all-round cricketer.
 Ahmed Hossain, Chairman Rangpur District Board and Minister for Agriculture, Forest and Fisheries (Undivided Bengal)
General Mustafizur Rahman, Former Chief of Army Staff of the Bangladesh Army.
Mustafa Kamal, former Chief Justice of Bangladesh and Chairman of Law Commission of Bangladesh.
Sharif Imam, husband of Shahid Janani Jahanara Imam.
Jahanara Imam, Bangladeshi writer and political activist.
Abbasuddin Ahmed, prominent Bhawaiya singer
Rathindranath Roy, founder of Bhawaiya academy and singer.
Ferdausi Rahman, folk singer.
Hassan Mahmood Khandker,  Bangladeshi former Inspector General of Bangladesh Police.
Mohammad Nurul Islam, former governor of Bangladesh Bank.
Mishrat Jahan Moushumi, women's footballer, Bangladesh Women's National Team.
Mosammat Sirat Jahan Shopna, women's footballer, Bangladesh women's national team.
Akbar Ali, Bangladeshi U-19 captain.
Mohammad Naim, Cricketer, Bangladesh National Team
Zamindars of Mahipur, aristocratic family of feudal lords

Members of tenth Jatiyo Sangsad
The members of the national parliament are:
 Rangpur-1: Md. Moshiur Rahman Ranga [from Jatiya Party].
 Rangpur-2: Abul Kalam Md. Ahasanul Hoque Chowdhury [from Awami League].
 Rangpur-3: Alhaj Hussain Muhammad Ershad [from Jatiya Party].
 Rangpur-4: Tipu Munshi [from Awami League].
 Rangpur-5: H.N. Ashequr Rahman [from Awami League].
 Rangpur-6: Dr. Shirin Sharmin Chaudhury [from Awami League].

Notes

References

External links

 Rangpur Municipality, Official website for Rangpur Municipality
 Rangpur Education
 Rangpur district, Information about Rangpur District

 
Districts of Bangladesh
Districts of Bangladesh established before 1971